Charles Alfred Zito Jr. (born March 1, 1953) is an American actor and boxer who is the former president of the New York chapter of the Hells Angels, and later became an actor.

Early life
Zito was born in New York, the second of three children of Charles Zito Sr. and Gloria Frangione. He was raised in the Bronx and New Rochelle. The son of a professional welterweight boxer, Zito was taught at an early age how to fight and defend himself. His father boxed under the ring name Al LaBarba and fought in 228 professional matches. At the age of seventeen, Zito dropped out of New Rochelle High School and married his high school sweetheart, Kathy. His involvement with the Hells Angels motorcycle club eventually led to their divorce. Zito became a refrigerator mechanic. He also worked as a bouncer at Café Central on the Upper West Side of Manhattan.

Boxing and martial arts
Zito was an amateur boxer for several years. He trained out of the Southside Boys Club in New Rochelle and Cage Recreation in White Plains, and held an amateur boxing record of 36–5. Zito had his first boxing match aged 12. At 17, he fought his first of four career Golden Gloves bouts when he knocked out Joe Pratt at 1:50 of round two of a preliminary bout in the  sub-novice division of the 47th annual New York Golden Gloves, held at the Felt Forum on January 30, 1973. Zito then defeated Michael Nesbitt in the tournament's third round at the Audubon Ballroom on February 19, 1973, before losing to Orlando Nieves in the fourth round of the competition at the Felt Forum on February 23, 1973. He returned to the Golden Gloves on February 2, 1978, losing to Gaylord Bryant at the Felt Forum in the  open division. Zito was later the boxing coach of Mickey Rourke.

Reflecting on his boxing career in 2003, Zito said: "I tried to follow in my father's footsteps... but didn’t have the desire and willpower to train 100 percent for the fight game. I didn't take it serious enough... When I found out I was fighting I'd go to the gym like two days before the fight. I never trained. I never got out and did my roadwork. I had so many distractions in my life, growing up at the same time. I think I could have been champion if I stuck with boxing." He further stated in a 2006 interview: "I got married young, at 17, and I had other things on my mind, but I wish I had gone pro, I would have been a good fighter". Zito began studying martial arts at the age of 18 and earned black belts in six different disciplines, including jujutsu. He claims to have broken his nose nine times and his hands eight times.

The combat sports reporter Thomas Gerbasi wrote that Zito "has achieved celebrity status in the fight game" as "a fixture at fights in and around the New York Tri-State area", remarking that "to the fighters, he's one of the guys". He developed friendships with Arturo Gatti, Vinny Pazienza and Mike Tyson. Zito was seen with Cuba Gooding Jr. and Dwayne Johnson at the Lennox Lewis vs. Mike Tyson pre-fight party on June 8, 2002 at the Memphis Pyramid. He first met Gatti in 1996 and accompanied the boxer to the ring for several high profile fights.

In 2003, Zito began his career as a broadcaster with a role as a sideline reporter on Monday Night Fights broadcasts on HBO. He was also a correspondent at the Affliction: Day of Reckoning mixed martial arts event on January 24, 2009.

Hells Angels
A motorcycle enthusiast, Zito established the New Rochelle Motorcycle Club in 1974, which merged with the Bronx-based Ching-a-Ling Nomads in 1976. He met Sandy Alexander, the president of the New York City chapter of the Hells Angels and a professional boxer, while they both trained at the Gramercy Gym on East 14th Street in Manhattan. After serving as a club "prospect" for a period of time, Zito was voted in as a member of the New York City Hells Angels in May 1979. Explaining what inspired him to join the Angels, Zito said: "I used to watch their movies like Hells Angels on Wheels and Hell's Angels '69 as a kid. They were the elite of the elite, the No. 1". According to prosecutors, one membership requirement of the Hells Angels' New York City chapter was that prospective members must kill or attempt to kill a target selected by the club as part of an initiation process. Zito allegedly earned his membership in the club by attempting to murder Robert Giangarra, a Queens pizzeria owner who had previously shot and injured Hells Angels biker Cortland "Chip" Candow in a Manhattan bar. According to testimony from John Joseph "Pirate" Miller, a Hells Angels member who turned government witness, Zito and another Hells Angel, Philip "Lightfoot" Kramer, used a remote-controlled device from a model airplane to detonate C-4 explosives attached to a vehicle belonging to Giangarra, who survived without serious injury. Zito was never charged with the bombing, although he was variously convicted of weapons possession, when police discovered a loaded pistol, ammunition and brass knuckles in his car, criminal possession of a controlled substance (Quaaludes), and disorderly conduct. The Federal Bureau of Investigation (FBI) began monitoring his "meteoric rise" in the Hells Angels. After rising to the rank of vice-president in the New York City charter, Zito assisted in the formation of the Hells Angels New York Nomads chapter in November 1984 and became the Nomads' founding president. The Nomads chapter, which is based between Syracuse and the northern suburbs of New York City, was allegedly formed after some members became frustrated with restrictions on narcotics distribution imposed by senior members of the New York City charter. Zito served as president of the Nomads chapter for ten years.

On May 2, 1985, 133 Hells Angels members and associates were arrested on racketeering and drug trafficking charges after a series of law enforcement raids in fourteen cities across the United States. The indictments were the culmination of Operation Roughrider, a three-year FBI investigation into the club. Fifteen of the arrests took place in the New York metropolitan area, where the New York City chapter headquarters on Manhattan's Lower East Side was raided, and at least one Uzi submachine gun and an undetermined quantity of drugs were seized. A warrant was issued for Zito's arrest on charges of selling  of methamphetamine in New York state in November 1984. Working as bodyguards for Bon Jovi on tour in Japan, Zito and fellow Hells Angels member Herbert Reynolds Kittel surrendered to the United States Embassy in Tokyo on July 22, 1985 after they were the subject of a nationwide dragnet by Japanese police at the request of the FBI. On October 14, the Tokyo High Court approved an extradition request by U.S. authorities. After detaining the pair in a Tokyo prison for four months, the Japanese Ministry of Justice released Zito and Kittel into the custody of U.S. Justice Department officials in Tokyo on October 26. Zito pleaded guilty to one felony drug count in late 1986 and was sentenced to ten years' imprisonment. His sentence was reduced to seven years' in 1988, and he ultimately served six years at nineteen different federal prisons. He was released from prison in 1991. Zito has stated that he "did six years for a phone call that [he] didn’t make to a man who sold drugs", and claims that he was bodyguarding actor Mickey Rourke on the set of Year of the Dragon in Vancouver when the phone call allegedly took place. On the stigma of being a Hells Angel, he has said: "I never did a drug in my life. It's ridiculous to judge a group on the actions of a few".

Zito was among a group of twenty Hells Angels arrested by a task force composed of agents from the FBI, Bureau of Alcohol, Tobacco, Firearms and Explosives (ATF), Illinois State Police, and the Chicago Police Department at O'Hare International Airport in Chicago after a high-speed car chase along the Northwest Tollway on December 11, 1994. The drivers of three passenger vans carrying the bikers were charged with speeding, while the passengers were charged with disorderly conduct. The contingent, which included senior Hells Angels members from across the country, had been attending a meeting to formally mark the club's merger of the Hell's Henchmen MC in Rockford, Illinois.

He was also present at the Hellraiser Ball, a tattoo and motorcycle trade exposition in Plainview, New York sponsored by the Long Island chapter of the HAMC, which was ambushed by dozens of members of the rival Pagan's Motorcycle Club on February 23, 2002, resulting in one biker being killed and at least ten injured. A Hells Angel was charged with second-degree murder and seventy-three Pagan members were indicted on federal racketeering charges in the aftermath of the incident.

Zito attended the funeral of Gambino crime family boss John Gotti in Queens on June 14, 2002. He declined to comment when he was approached by reporters after the wake.

In 2004, Zito left the Hells Angels, after 25 years of membership in the club, to focus on his acting career. He resigned from the club in "good standing", an option reportedly extended only to the Hells Angels' most respected members.

Hollywood
Following in his father's footsteps, Zito became an amateur boxer and fought in New York Golden Gloves while working manual labor. In 1979, after assisting the bodyguards of actor Robert Conrad at a motorcycle convention at the New York Coliseum, Zito began his own bodyguard agency, Charlie's Angels Bodyguard Service. Zito initially provided protection for actress Lorna Luft and later was hired by her half-sister Liza Minnelli. The actress recommended Zito's service to her plethora of celebrity acquaintances, allowing Zito to quickly develop contacts throughout Hollywood. His other clients included Muhammad Ali, Charles Bronson, Michael Jackson, Sean Penn, Chita Rivera, Eric Roberts, Mickey Rourke, Charlie Sheen, Sylvester Stallone, and Elizabeth Taylor. Zito's brother-in-law was a policeman, which allowed him to hire moonlighting police officers to bodyguard celebrities at public events which required additional manpower, such as award shows.

In 1979, Zito and 18 other members of the New York City Hells Angels chapter were hired to appear in the film Dead Ringer, starring Meat Loaf and Cher. The film was never released due to litigation. Parlaying his connection with Mickey Rourke, Zito began a career as a stuntman in 1983 when he acted as Rourke's stunt double in the film Year of the Dragon. He later worked on over 50 films such as Nowhere to Run, The Specialist, True Lies, Die Hard with a Vengeance, Heat, Eraser, The Juror and The Rock. Zito acted as stunt coordinator for the first time on Santa with Muscles. He then also began landing small acting roles in films, including Heaven's Prisoners, No Code of Conduct and Gia. In 1996, after a meeting with producer Tom Fontana, Zito joined the HBO prison drama Oz as mobster Chucky Pancamo. He was a cast member until the show ended in 2003, after six seasons.

Zito has reportedly been involved in physical altercations with several celebrities. In 1997, he allegedly knocked gossip columnist A. J. Benza unconscious at the Scores strip club in Manhattan after Benza attributed a false rumor to him in his column in the Daily News. Zito is purported to have punched Jean-Claude Van Damme, who had previously been a bodyguarding client of his, in another incident at Scores on February 5, 1998. Recounting the incident in his autobiography, Zito claims that he suffered a broken hand as a result of striking Van Damme numerous times after Van Damme had told a bouncer at the club that Zito had "no heart" and the bouncer relayed Van Damme's comments to Zito. He reportedly stood over a prone Van Damme shouting: "This ain't the movies! This is the street, and I own the street!". Zito has stated: "I hope we can be friends again, but he was abusive. Some people will take that kind of abuse. I am not one of them." He later added: "If I knew it would have gotten me so much positive publicity, I would have knocked him out 10 years earlier." Zito is also reputed to have delivered two open-handed slaps to the face of actor Gary Busey in a similar incident.

Zito appeared on the January 11, 1999 edition of WCW Monday Nitro accompanying Hollywood Hulk Hogan to the ring alongside several other members of the Hells Angels. In 2002, Zito released his autobiography, Street Justice, co-authored with Joe Layden. He released a self-defense and dieting video, Chuck Zito's Street Survival System, in 2005. Zito appeared in Carlito's Way: Rise to Power the same year. In 2006, he expanded into radio with the show Chuck Zito's View on Howard Stern's Sirius Satellite Radio station. He also hosted Chuck Zito’s Italian Bad Boy Hour on WVOX.

In 2010, Zito filed a $5 million lawsuit against the cable network FX, alleging that he had a development meeting with them in 2006, in which he pitched the idea of an outlaw motorcycle group. He alleges that FX blew him off and then stole his idea, which became the FX show Sons of Anarchy. On December 11, 2011, a court judgment was ruled against Zito. Zito appeared in Sons of Anarchy season 5, as Frankie Diamonds. He also appeared in SOA creator Kurt Sutter's Discovery Channel documentary series, Outlaw Empires.

Personal life
Zito has a daughter, Lisa, with his ex-wife Kathy. His daughter became an entertainment lawyer for Condé Nast in Manhattan. In the aftermath of the September 11 attacks of 2001, Zito violated a protective order that prohibited him from contacting Kathy when he made a phone call to his wife and daughter in Manhattan. In 2002, he pleaded guilty to violating an order of protection. When given a choice by Westchester County Supreme Court Justice Daniel Angiolillo of a year of violence education classes or 15 days in county jail, Zito chose the latter, telling the judge: "...if I'm in a room with a bunch of guys bragging about how they beat their wives, I'm gonna smack someone." He served twelve days in jail. In 2005, he announced that he and Kathy had stopped trying to reconcile after 30 years of marriage and numerous attempts at reconciling. At the time, Zito had not spoken to his daughter Lisa in five years and therefore had never met his two grandchildren.

Filmography

Film

Television

See also
 Outlaw motorcycle club

References

External links
 
 
 Street Justice: Autobiography
 Eddie Goldman interviews Chuck Zito

1953 births
Living people
20th-century American criminals
20th-century American male actors
21st-century American male actors
American male boxers
American male criminals
American male film actors
American male karateka
American male television actors
American people convicted of drug offenses
American people of Italian descent
American prisoners and detainees
American radio personalities
American stunt performers
Bodyguards
Boxers from New York City
Criminals from the Bronx
Entertainers from the Bronx
Hells Angels
Male actors from New Rochelle, New York
Male actors from New York City
Prisoners and detainees of the United States federal government
Radio personalities from New York City
Sportspeople from the Bronx